Lettice Margaret Everton Bisbrown (8 June 1919 – 20 October 2009) was a British diver. She competed in the women's 10 metre platform event at the 1948 Summer Olympics.

Bisbrown received a fine in November 1937 after being found guilty of driving "without due care and attention" which resulted in a crash. On 20 September 1941, Bisbrown, then described as the "champion woman diver of the North", married Arthur Day at Brook Road Methodist Chapel.

References

External links
 

1919 births
2009 deaths
British female divers
Olympic divers of Great Britain
Divers at the 1948 Summer Olympics
Sportspeople from Runcorn